The Wabasca River is the largest tributary of the Peace River watershed in northern Alberta, Canada.

Course 
The Wabasca River originates in the Sandy Lake, north-east of Slave Lake, then flows in the South and North Wabasca Lake at the hamlet of Wabasca. It continues north through boreal forest and muskeg and discharges in the Peace River west of Fort Vermilion.

Tributaries 
Willow River
Muskwa River
Pastecho River
Trout River
Wood Buffalo River
Woodenhouse River
Liége River
Panny River
Loon River
Muddy River
Bear River

Wabasca Lakes 
Two lakes, South and North Wabasca, are formed along the river. The community of Wabasca and the Wabasca Airport are located between the two lakes.

The Wabasca 166 (a, b, c and d) indian reserves of the Bigstone Cree First Nations are established on the shores of the lakes, and Tall Cree 173 of the Tallcree tribe is near the mouth of the river.

See also 
List of Alberta rivers

References 

Rivers of Alberta